Suji-gu office Station is a metro station located in Pungdeokcheon-dong, Suji-gu, Yongin, Gyeonggi-do, South Korea. The station is decorated with a holographic aquarium.

It is located at the center of the Suji-gu district and the district office, surrounded by many shops, restaurants, cafes, bars, clinics and banks. The Royal Sports Center, which houses large swimming pools, is located directly in front of the station. A large Lotte Mart with Toys R Us is also located nearby.

Frequent riders from this station to Pangyo Station can claim a cashback once they fill discounts of 100 won for every ride until 5000 won, when it can be claimed.

References

Seoul Metropolitan Subway stations
Metro stations in Yongin
Railway stations opened in 2016